The King is the second album by Scottish alternative rock band Teenage Fanclub, deleted on its day of release in 1991.

The album is often derided as a hastily assembled contractual obligation to US label Matador (allowing the group to sign to Geffen without penalty). In 2020, Matador co-owner Gerard Cosloy confirms that The King was pitched to the label as the second release, but passed, saying it felt more like a contractual obligation fulfillment than a real album. However the group have denied this, claiming that the shambolic, spontaneous nature of the contents was a direct influence of producer Don Fleming, whose music was often improvised. "One night we all got completely wasted. ... and we said, "Let’s make a LP overnight. We’ll just improvise some songs and do some covers and cobble it all together", Norman Blake said in 2016. In a 2006 interview, Blake and Brendan O'Hare confirmed that the album had been recorded immediately after completing Bandwagonesque using pre-booked studio time that became available when the aforementioned album was finished sooner than anticipated. They also claimed that the album was intended to be a mid-price edition of 1,000 but their then UK label Creation Records pressed 20,000 and sold them at full price .

The album was rereleased on vinyl for Record Store Day 2019.

Track listing

Personnel

Teenage Fanclub

Norman Blake – guitar, vocals 
Gerard Love – bass, vocals
Raymond McGinley – guitar, vocals
Brendan O'Hare – drums

Additional musicians

Joe McAlinden – saxophone
Paul Chisholm – additional drums

Technical

Don Fleming – producer
Teenage Fanclub – producer
Paul Chisholm – producer, engineer
Keith Hartley – engineer
Dave Buchanan – assistant engineer

References

External links
The King on Discogs.com

Teenage Fanclub albums
1991 albums
Albums produced by Don Fleming (musician)
Creation Records albums